The Virginia Cavaliers men's basketball team is the intercollegiate men's basketball program representing the University of Virginia. The school competes in the Atlantic Coast Conference (ACC) in Division I of the National Collegiate Athletic Association (NCAA). Virginia has won the NCAA Championship, two National Invitation Tournaments, and three ACC tournament titles. The team is coached by Tony Bennett and plays home games at the on-campus John Paul Jones Arena (14,623) which opened in 2006. They have been called the Cavaliers since 1923, predating the Cleveland Cavaliers of the NBA by half a century.

Virginia won its first NCAA Championship in 2019, and won the last third-place game ever played at the Final Four in 1981. The Cavaliers have been ranked in the Top 5 of the AP Poll more than 100 times since 1980, and have received seven No. 1 seeds in the NCAA tournament. Virginia is the only ACC program, and one of two NCAA programs, to have earned No. 1 seeds in all four regions of the NCAA Tournament.
  
Virginia was a top program in the early years of college basketball under the tutelage of Pop Lannigan from 1905 to 1929 and a consistent winner under multi-sport coach Gus Tebell from 1930 to 1951, but the Cavaliers struggled through the 1950s and 1960s before Terry Holland arrived in 1974 to win their first ACC Championship and earn their first NCAA tournament appearance in just his second year. The program has since won ten ACC season titles, third-most in conference history. In the recent 18-game ACC era (2012–2019), Virginia had four out of the five ACC teams that finished 16–2 or better in conference play. As of 2022, Virginia has had 11 consecutive winning ACC seasons, the longest active streak among ACC programs.

History 
The Wahoos, as they are unofficially known, began their history under the tutelage of a Welshman and American immigrant known best as "Pop", Henry Lannigan. Lannigan began the program in 1905 after training Olympic Games hopefuls in track and field and quickly brought the basketball program into near-dominant form. He led the Cavaliers to a perfect record of 17–0 in 1914-15 and a Southern Conference title in its inaugural season of 1921–22. After reaching prominence the team was invited to help the nationally known Kentucky Wildcats showcase their new Alumni Gymnasium. Virginia dominated Kentucky, 29–16. Inviting Kentucky back to Memorial Gymnasium in 1928, Virginia again won, 31–28. Lannigan's record of 254–95 (.728) held the Virginia record for best career winning percentage by a head coach until finally surpassed by a man who was hired 104 years after he started the program.

After Lannigan's sudden death in 1930 and with limited administration interest at the onset of the Great Depression, Virginia basketball did not maintain its momentum into the next several decades. Buzzy Wilkinson scored 32.1 points per game in 1954–55 and is still the all-time ACC leader in scoring per game for both the single-season and career (28.1) categories. He was selected by the Boston Celtics in the 1955 NBA draft. Unfortunately, Virginia teams of the era were not as great at defense and high scoring did not lead to many wins. Likewise, Barry Parkhill was named ACC Men's Basketball Player of the Year in 1971–72 and was drafted in the first round by the Portland Trail Blazers but the program had not regained its early standing.

Terry Holland was hired from Davidson in 1975, and with star Wally Walker surprised the ACC in just his second year as head coach when his sixth-seeded Virginia defeated AP No. 17 NC State, No. 9 Maryland and No. 4 North Carolina en route to winning the school's first ACC Championship. Played in Landover, Maryland, it was also and fittingly the first ACC Tournament held outside of North Carolina. Athletic, quick, and seven-foot-four, Ralph Sampson was perhaps the most desired high school recruit in college basketball history when he chose to play with Jeff Lamp at Virginia over Kentucky in 1979. He lived up to that hype would become one of the most dominant college players the game has ever known, winning three consecutive Naismith College Player of the Year awards to tie him with Bill Walton as the most awarded individual player in NCAA history. Virginia would attain its first AP Top 5 rankings and go to its first Final Four in Sampson's era, but would be stonewalled by Dean Smith and North Carolina both in that Final Four and in ACC tournaments. Carolina notoriously held the ball in a four corners offense for most of the last seven minutes of the game, despite having UNC's most celebrated NBA superstars Michael Jordan and James Worthy on the floor, to defeat Virginia in the 1982 ACC tournament 47–45. Both the shot clock and three-point line were implemented into college basketball during the same decade in part to combat such shenanigans. In 1984, after Sampson was drafted first in the 1983 NBA draft, Virginia made a Cinderella run back to the Final Four. There they lost 49–47, in overtime, to a Houston team led by the first pick of the 1984 NBA draft, Hakeem Olajuwon, who then joined Sampson to form the original Twin Towers of the NBA on the Houston Rockets.

John Crotty and Bryant Stith took the darkhorse 1988–89 team to the Elite Eight after defeating AP No. 2 (and No. 1 seed) Oklahoma which returned most of its lineup (including Stacey King and Mookie Blaylock) from the team that reached the 1988 NCAA Tournament Championship Game. After Holland retired the next year, the Cavaliers were coached by Jeff Jones for eight years, Pete Gillen for seven, and Dave Leitao for four. Highlights of those teams include a Jones team headlined by Cory Alexander and Junior Burrough that also reached the Elite Eight after a first-place finish in the ACC standings of 1995. There were no championship teams under Gillen, but his recruits Sean Singletary and J. R. Reynolds led the 2007 team to Virginia's next conference-topping finish in Leitao's second season. While there were flashes of brilliance under each of the three coaches, the program regained and expanded its national prominence under the coach who followed them.

Tony Bennett arrived in March 2009 and got to work in building "a program that lasts." His 2013–14 team led by Joe Harris and Malcolm Brogdon brought Virginia its first ACC Tournament Championship in 38 years and its first Sweet Sixteen appearance in 19 years. The 2014–15 squad, led by Justin Anderson and Brogdon, started 19–0 and was even more dominant throughout the season as this team more than doubled up the scores of Georgia Tech and Wake Forest, only the second and third times in history that one ACC team scored twice as many points as another ACC team in official competition. However, Anderson broke his finger against Louisville and did not return until the NCAA Tournament where he was much diminished and the team bowed out to Michigan State in the second round. Brogdon led the 2015–16 team to the Elite Eight, but they fell just short of the elusive Final Four after a late rally by Syracuse. Shocking the basketball world twice in two years, Virginia lost to 16-seed UMBC in the first round of the 2018 NCAA Tournament only to come back and win the 2019 NCAA tournament championship the very next year. ESPN called Virginia's 2018–19 campaign "the most redemptive season in the history of college basketball." CBS This Morning called it "basketball's ultimate redemption story" the morning after the national championship match.

As of 2022, Bennett has led Virginia to the program's first NCAA Tournament Championship, third Final Four, second and third ACC Tournament Championships, and five of ten seasons Virginia has finished first in the ACC season standings. He holds the single-season wins record with 35 from the 2018–19 season, breaking his own previous record of 31.

NCAA Final Four teams 
Virginia is 3–2 at Final Four events and won the 2019 NCAA tournament championship.

1981: Sampson and Goliath 
Led by Coach Terry Holland, National Player of the Year Ralph Sampson and his first team All-ACC teammate Jeff Lamp, the Cavaliers rolled to their best season in school history.  After beginning the season with a 23–0 record, the Cavaliers would claim the ACC Regular Season title before falling in the ACC Tournament Semifinals.  Despite the loss, UVA still entered the NCAA tournament as the 1 seed in the East Regional of the 1981 NCAA tournament.

UVA received a first-round bye and squeaked by Villanova 54–50 in the 2nd round.  They then handled both Tennessee and Brigham Young by 14 points each in the Sweet 16 and Elite 8 respectively to clinch a berth in the program's first ever Final Four in Philadelphia.  Despite sweeping North Carolina in the ACC regular season, the rival Tar Heels would defeat the Cavaliers in the National Semifinals.  Virginia closed the season on a high note, however, defeating Louisiana State in the National Third Place game to cap the program's most successful season to that point.

1984: Virginia plays Cinderella 
Following the loss of their vaunted All-American in Sampson, the Virginia basketball team took a step back in 1983–84, at least in the regular season.  The Cavaliers limped into the ACC tournament with a 17–10 (6–8) record, promptly falling to Wake Forest in the first round.  Their record was good enough to ensure them an NCAA tournament invite and they were awarded the 7-seed in the East Regional.

After escaping 10th-seeded Iona 58–57 in the first round, Virginia drew Southwest Conference champion and 2nd-seeded Arkansas in the 2nd round.  The Cavaliers dispatched the Razorbacks 53–51 in an overtime affair before cruising past 3rd-seeded Syracuse 63–55 in the Sweet Sixteen.  In a low-scoring, defensive affair, the Cavaliers defeated Bobby Knight's 4th-seeded Indiana Hoosiers 50–48 in the Elite Eight to clinch the school's second Final Four appearance in 4 seasons.

In the National Semifinals, Virginia drew the Hakeem Olajuwon-led Houston Cougars at the Kingdome in Seattle.  The Cavaliers gave the vaunted Phi Slama Jama lineup all they could handle, but eventually fell 49–47 in overtime, ending a surprisingly-successful postseason run.

2019: Redemption National Championship 

Coming off a loss to 16-seed UMBC a year prior, the Virginia team returned with a vaunted Bennett defense along with the three-pronged offensive attack of De'Andre Hunter, Kyle Guy, and Ty Jerome. The Cavaliers began and ended the season ranked in the AP Top 5, with a 28–2 regular season record and both losses to Zion Williamson's AP No. 1 ranked Duke squad under Coach Krzyzewski. Those two Virginia–Duke matchups during the ACC regular season were the most watched college basketball games of the regular season with 3.8 million and 3.3 million viewers for their games in Durham and Charlottesville respectively.  n the ACC Tournament, Virginia defeated bubble team NC State 76–56 before being defeated by Florida State, 69–59. Entering the NCAA Tournament, Virginia was a No. 1 seed in the South region, Duke was the No. 1 overall seed and placed in the East region, while North Carolina also received a No. 1 seed but in the Midwest region. The only No. 1 seed from another conference was Gonzaga in the West, later to be defeated by Texas Tech in the Elite Eight.

Virginia was the sole No. 1 seed of the tournament to advance to the Final Four after defeating Purdue. After first defeating Gardner-Webb, Oklahoma, and Oregon, they met the Boilermakers in the Elite Eight. Purdue's Carsen Edwards scored 42 points against Virginia, setting an individual scoring record against a Bennett-coached team. With Virginia down by three points with 5.9 seconds to play, Ty Jerome stepped to the line for two free throws, converting the first but missing the second. Mamadi Diakite back tapped the ball into the backcourt where Kihei Clark recovered it and passed back to Diakite with one second remaining in the game. Diakite immediately scored, and the game went into overtime. Virginia then outscored Purdue 10–5 in the extra period to advance. Jerome, Diakite, and Kyle Guy each made the South Regional All-Tournament team.

In the Final Four, Virginia met the Auburn Tigers who had already dispatched Kansas, North Carolina, and Kentucky to get there. This game was a back-and-forth battle as Virginia trailed the Tigers at halftime, 31–28. Virginia led by as many as 10 points in the second half before Auburn retook the lead late in the game. Down 61–57 with 7.7 seconds remaining, Guy scored a three-point shot from the right corner. Harper then converted one of two free throws to lead 62–60. Two controversial non-calls (one against Auburn, one against Virginia) by officials preceded Auburn being called for a foul with 1.5 seconds remaining. On the in-bounds play Jerome found Guy, again for the corner three, but Guy missed as an Auburn player fouled him by undercutting his lower body. Guy converted all three free throws to put Virginia into the 2019 NCAA Tournament Championship Game.

The National Championship match was headlined by two of the top defenses in college basketball, Virginia and the Texas Tech Red Raiders. Texas Tech did not score a field goal for the first 7 minutes and 11 seconds of the game, but eventually tied the game at 19 with 7 minutes and 33 seconds remaining in the first half. The teams traded leads until halftime, with Virginia holding a 32–29 advantage at intermission. Eventual top-10 picks in the subsequent NBA draft De'Andre Hunter and Jarrett Culver shot 1-for-8 and 0-for-6 from the field respectively in the first half, but Hunter shot 7-for-8 in the second half to end with a career-high 27 points while the NABC Defensive Player of the Year sophomore limited Culver to 5-for-22 shooting and a 15-point total. Texas Tech rallied from a deficit to take a late lead before Virginia scored in the closing seconds to take the game into overtime. Virginia outscored Texas Tech 17–9 in overtime to win their first national title 85–77.

Virginia ended the season with a 35–3 record, breaking the school record for wins in a single-season. The team was 29–0 after leading at halftime. The Cavaliers were the first first-time champions of the NCAA Tournament since the University of Florida thirteen years earlier.  In light of the previous year's loss to UMBC, ESPN called Virginia's championship run "the most redemptive season in the history of college basketball," and NBC Sports described it as "the greatest redemption story in the history of sports."

ACC Tournament championship teams 
Virginia has won the ACC tournament three times, defeating Duke or North Carolina in each title game.

1976: Miracle in Landover 
The 1975–76 Cavalier season was largely disappointing as they finished 13–11 overall (4–8, ACC) and limped into the ACC tournament as the 6th seed.  Played at the Capital Centre in Landover, Maryland, the tournament was the first in ACC history to be played outside the state of North Carolina.

Despite falling to NC State twice during the regular season, the Cavaliers upset the 3rd-seeded Wolfpack 75–63.  The Cavaliers then drew 2-seed Maryland, longtime border rivals that had just defeated UVA five days earlier at Cole Fieldhouse.  Virginia defeated the AP No. 9 Terrapins, before dispatching top-seeded and AP No. 4 North Carolina 67–62 in the championship game.  It marked the first conference tournament title and NCAA appearance for Virginia, as well as only the 3rd time a non-North Carolina-based team won the conference title (following Maryland in 1958 and South Carolina in 1971).  Wally Walker scored 21 points and grabbed 7 rebounds in the title game, being named tournament MVP in the process.

Virginia was awarded the East Region's 7 seed in the NCAA tournament, where they fell to 2nd-seeded DePaul in the first round.

2014: Bennett Ball arrives 

After a few years of steady improvement, Tony Bennett finally had a team he had fully recruited and coached.  The Cavaliers got off to a forgettable 9–4 start, punctuated by a 35-point road loss at Tennessee.  Following a pivotal conversation between star G/F Joe Harris and Bennett, UVA got on track and rolled through the ACC.  On March 1, the 12th ranked Cavaliers would defeat #4 Syracuse at John Paul Jones Arena to clinch the ACC regular season title outright for the first time since 1981, allowing them to enter the 2014 ACC men's basketball tournament as the 1-seed.

After cruising against 8th seeded Florida State, Virginia held off 4th-seeded Pittsburgh in the final seconds of the semifinal, setting up a championship game against 3rd seeded Duke at Greensboro Coliseum.   The Cavaliers would exact revenge for a regular season loss to the Blue Devils, defeating them 72–63 and claiming their first ACC tournament title in 38 years.  Joe Harris was named tournament MVP while Malcolm Brogdon joined him as a 1st team selection.  In the process, UVA defeated every ACC opponent at least once in a season for the first time since 1982.

2018: Calm before the storm 

After losing all-conference point guard London Perrantes to graduation and the Cleveland Cavaliers, many expected 2017-18 to be a rebuilding year for Virginia basketball.  The team would start the season unranked before getting off to an 11–1 non-conference start and climbing up to No. 13 in the country at the start of conference play.  Virginia would then become the first team to go 17–1 in conference play, notably snapping a long losing streak at Cameron Indoor Stadium against Duke, scoring 5 points in 0.9 seconds to stun Louisville at the KFC Yum! Center, and only losing one conference game by a single point in overtime.

They would open the ACC tournament by routing 9th-seeded Louisville 75–58 in the quarterfinals before dispatching 4th-seeded Clemson 64–58 in the semis.  They would then rematch with a North Carolina team they had defeated earlier in Charlottesville and claim the ACC championship with a 71–63 win.  Kyle Guy was named tournament MVP and was joined on the First team by Devon Hall as the Cavaliers gave Tony Bennett his second ACC tournament title in 5 seasons.

Seasons

Results by season (1980–present)

Postseasons

NCAA tournament results
The Cavaliers have appeared in the NCAA tournament 25 times. Their combined record is 35–24. They were national champions in 2019.

NCAA Tournament seeding history
Virginia is one of five NCAA programs to earn a No. 1 seed in the NCAA Division I men's basketball tournament seven or more times.

The NCAA began seeding the NCAA Tournament with the 1979 edition. The 64-team field started in 1985, which guaranteed that a championship team had to win six games.

NIT results
The Cavaliers have appeared in the National Invitation Tournament (NIT) 14 times. Their combined record is 19–12. They were NIT champions in 1980 and 1992.

CBI results
The Cavaliers appeared in the inaugural College Basketball Invitational (CBI), in 2008. Their record is 2–1.

Rivalries

Annual Home-and-Away Series

Louisville Cardinals
Following conference realignment, the Cardinals moved from the Big East to the ACC and were designated UVA's home-and-away rivals. The two teams had previously met for four straight years outside of their conferences in the 1980s during an era both programs were highly ranked. The Cavaliers won each of those games in 1982, 1983, 1984, and 1985. In the ACC, the two teams have acted as spoilers to the other with a Cardinal win in 2015 and a 2017 Cavalier win delaying or preventing an ACC regular season title, while an injury to star player Justin Anderson during the 2015 matchup derailed UVA's national championship aspirations. The March 2018 matchup between the two teams ended with Virginia scoring five points in the final 0.9 seconds and dealing what proved to be a mortal blow to Louisville's NCAA tournament hopes. Both teams won recent NCAA Championships — Louisville in 2013 and Virginia in 2019. UVA leads the all-time series 16–5.

Virginia Tech Hokies
As the two Power Conference teams in the Commonwealth, the Cavaliers and Hokies have a long-standing rivalry.  While the intensity has picked up since Virginia Tech joined the ACC in 2004, the all-time series record is well in favor of UVA, with the Cavaliers leading the series 95–56.

Other rivalries

North Carolina Tar Heels
As the two oldest universities of the ACC, the UVA–UNC rivalry spans many sports and has persisted to varying degrees since the late 1800s. The early 1980s were a particular highlight for the basketball series as all-time greats Ralph Sampson and Michael Jordan led two Top 5 programs of the era. The Tar Heels have dominated much of the all-time series and lead 131–60, but Virginia is 11–4 against the Heels since the Cavaliers began their rise back to national prominence under Tony Bennett in the 2012–13 season. The two teams defeated each other for ACC Tournament Championships in 2016 and 2018, and the winner of those conference title matches went on to win NCAA Championships the following year (UNC in 2017 and UVA in 2019).

Maryland Terrapins
Thanks to the proximity of these two long-time ACC members, and their status as Tobacco Road outsiders, Maryland and Virginia have a long-standing rivalry that spans many decades.  Traditionally, these two schools would meet in the last game of the season, and acted as spoilers to each other as they sought ACC season championships and NCAA Tournament appearances.  This rivalry has been diminished in recent years, thanks to Maryland's move to the Big Ten Conference. They did match up in the 2014 and 2018 ACC-Big Ten Challenges, ending in 76–65 and 76–71 victories both won by Virginia on the road in College Park.

Coaches

Virginia has had 11 head coaches lead the Cavaliers. The longest tenure was Pop Lannigan, who coached the team for 24 years starting in 1905.

Statistics

Individual honors

Notable alumni

National honors

Consensus First-Team All-American.
AP Honorable-Mention All-American.

Retired numbers

The Cavaliers have retired eight numbers to date:

Retired jerseys
The University of Virginia's athletic department has issued the following statement distinguishing "retired jerseys" from "retired numbers": "Jersey retirement honors Virginia players who have significantly impacted the program. Individuals recognized in this way will have their jerseys retired, but their number will remain active."

All-time leaders

Notes

References

External links
 

 
Basketball teams established in 1905
1905 establishments in Virginia

it:Virginia Cavaliers (pallacanestro)